Frithjov Meier Vik (15 March 1902 – 2 January 1986) was a Norwegian politician for the Conservative Party.

He was born in Kvæfjord.

He was elected to the Norwegian Parliament from Troms in 1954, and was re-elected on two occasions.

Vik was deputy mayor of Kvæfjord municipality in 1950–1951 and 1951–1954.

References

1902 births
1986 deaths
People from Kvæfjord
Conservative Party (Norway) politicians
Members of the Storting
20th-century Norwegian politicians